The Blair Islands are a group of small islands lying  west of Cape Gray, at the east side of the entrance to Commonwealth Bay, George V Land, Antarctica. They were discovered by the Australasian Antarctic Expedition (1911–14) under Douglas Mawson, who named the group for John H. Blair, Chief Officer on the Aurora.

See also 
 List of Antarctic and sub-Antarctic islands

References 

Islands of George V Land